Hants was a federal electoral district in Nova Scotia, Canada, that was represented in the House of Commons of Canada from 1867 to 1925. It was created in the British North America Act, 1867, and abolished in 1924 when it was merged into Hants—Kings riding. It consisted of Hants County.

Members of Parliament

This riding elected the following Members of Parliament:

Election results

See also 

 List of Canadian federal electoral districts
 Past Canadian electoral districts

External links 
 Riding history for Hants (1867–1924) from the Library of Parliament

Former federal electoral districts of Nova Scotia